The Girl mansion (女宿, pinyin: Nǚ Xiù) is one of the Twenty-eight mansions of the Chinese constellations.  It is one of the northern mansions of the Black Tortoise.

Asterisms

Notes 

Chinese constellations